Summer Hill is an unincorporated community in Pike County, Illinois, United States. U.S. Route 54 runs through the town connecting it with Pittsfield approximately six miles to the northeast.

History
Lyman Scott founded Summer Hill in 1845, one year after building a summer home at the site. Scott, a prominent local merchant, established and funded the community's first school shortly thereafter. Scott's house, which is listed on the National Register of Historic Places, is the oldest surviving home in the community.

References

Unincorporated communities in Pike County, Illinois
Unincorporated communities in Illinois